Marlon Tuipulotu (born May 31, 1999) is an American football defensive tackle for the Philadelphia Eagles of the National Football League (NFL). He played college football at USC.

Early years
Tuipulotu attended Central High School in Independence, Oregon. As a senior in 2016, he had 62 tackles and six sacks. Tuipulotu played in the 2017 U.S. Army All-American Bowl. He originally committed to the University of Washington to play college football but switched his commitment to the University of Southern California (USC). Tuipulotu was also on the wrestling team in high school and won the 5A State Championship at 285lb in 2016.

He is of Tongan descent.

College career
Tuipulotu played in three games his first year at USC in 2017 due to injuries and took a redshirt. As a redshirt freshman in 2018, he started 10 of 12 games and recorded 33 tackles and 4.5 sacks. In 2019, he had 46 tackles and two sacks in 12 starts. Tuipulotu returned as a starter in 2020.

Professional career

Tuipulotu was drafted by the Philadelphia Eagles in the sixth round, 189th overall, in the 2021 NFL Draft.

In Week 8 of the 2022 NFL season, Tuipulotu recorded his first sack of his career on Pittsburgh Steelers Quarterback Kenny Pickett in a 13-35 win. 

In Week 10 of the 2022 NFL season, Tuipulotu recorded his first fumble recover of his career against the Washington Commanders.

He was placed on injured reserve on November 16, 2022.  Without Tuipulotu, the Eagles reached Super Bowl LVII but lost 38-35 to the Kansas City Chiefs.

References

External links
USC Trojans bio

1999 births
Living people
American people of Tongan descent
People from Independence, Oregon
Players of American football from Oregon
American football defensive tackles
USC Trojans football players
Philadelphia Eagles players